Hamitabat may refer to:

 Hamitabat, İnegöl
 Hamitabat, Söğüt